Robert J. Gardner (September 28, 1837 – September 23, 1902) was an American soldier who fought in the American Civil War. Gardner received his country's highest award for bravery during combat, the Medal of Honor. Gardner's medal was won for being among the first to enter Fort Gregg during the Third Battle of Petersburg in Virginia on April 2, 1865. He was honored with the award on May 12, 1865.

Gardner joined the Army from Egremont, Massachusetts in July 1862, and mustered out with his regiment in June 1865. He was buried in Parkers Corners, Michigan.

Medal of Honor citation

See also
List of American Civil War Medal of Honor recipients: G–L

References

1837 births
1902 deaths
American Civil War recipients of the Medal of Honor
People from Livingston, New York
People of New York (state) in the American Civil War
United States Army Medal of Honor recipients